Rhynchocypris is a genus of fairly small Eurasian cyprinid fishes.  There are currently seven described species in this genus.

Species
 Rhynchocypris czekanowskii (Dybowski, 1869) (Czekanowski's minnow)
 Rhynchocypris dementjevi (Turdakov & Piskarev, 1954)
 Rhynchocypris deogyuensis Lee & Sim, 2017
 Rhynchocypris lagowskii (Dybowski, 1869) (Amur minnow)
 Rhynchocypris oxycephalus (Sauvage & Dabry de Thiersant, 1874) (Chinese minnow)
 Rhynchocypris percnurus (Pallas, 1814) (Lake minnow)
 Rhynchocypris poljakowii (Kessler, 1879) (Balkhash minnow)

References
 

 
Taxa named by Albert Günther